The 1959–60 Alpha Ethniki was the 24th season of the highest football league of Greece and the first season of the nationwide league after the league replaced the Panhellenic Championship. The season began on 25 October 1959 and ended on 31 July 1960 with the play-off matches. Panathinaikos won their fourth Greek title and their first in seven years.

The 16 teams that formed the first national championship were resulted as follows:
Panathenian Championship: The first 4 teams of the 1958–59 season. (Panathinaikos, Panionios, AEK Athens and Apollon Athens)
Piraeus' Championship: The first 3 teams of the 1958–59 season. (Olympiacos, Ethnikos Piraeus and AE Nikaia)
Macedonian Championship: The first 3 teams of the 1958–59 season. (Aris, PAOK and Apollon Kalamarias)
Regional Championship Southern Group:The first 2 teams of the 1958–59 season. (Panegialios and Pankorinthiakos)
Regional Championship Northern Group:The first 2 teams of the 1958–59 season. (Doxa Drama and Megas Alexandros Katerinis)
The 2 final places were secured after a play-off matches by the 4th teams Piraeus' and Macedonian Championship against the 2nd teams of the South and North group respectively. (Proodeftiki and Iraklis against Olympiacos Chalkidas/OFI Crete and Aspida Xanthi)

The point system was: Win: 3 points - Draw: 2 points - Loss: 1 point.

Qualification round
Initially there were going to be 18 teams in the first division, however, the delay of 6 weeks in the start of the event due to the financial negotiations between the involved parties General Secretary of Sport, OPAP, HFF and in some places FCAs, put its serious completion in a timely manner. The HFF took the decision to reduce the number of teams to 16 and as a consequence a promotional play-off round was formed to decide the last two places of the championship.

Southern Group 2nd-place play-offs

|}

Olympiacos Chalkida qualifies to the promotional Play-offs.

Promotion play-offs

|+South

|}

|+North

|}

League table

Results

Championship play-off

Top scorers

External links
Hellenic Football Federation 
Rec.Sport.Soccer Statistics Foundation

Alpha Ethniki seasons
Greece
1